Mongolia competed at the 2009 World Games in Kaohsiung, Taiwan, from July 16, 2009 to July 26, 2009.

Medalists

Competitors

Sumo
Mongolia has qualified to the games four man and four woman. Four man and three man entered main competition. Baljinnyam Baterdene, who was in entry list of women's lightweight and openweight events didn't start in the competition.

References 

Nations at the 2009 World Games
2009
2009 in Mongolian sport